West Leeds High School Specialist Technology College was a mixed comprehensive school located in Armley in Leeds, West Yorkshire, England. The school had around 1,200 students on roll from ages 11 to 18. The school was replaced with Swallow Hill Community College in 2009, following the merger between two local schools. After 102 years West Leeds High School closed and replaced by Swallow Hill.

History
The school served the Armley, Bramley and Wortley areas of Leeds for 100 years.

Grammar school
The West Leeds High School opened on 7 September 1907 to improve standards in the city. The school was effectively two schools in one as both Girls and Boys were kept completely separate from each other. In September 1930, following a knock on the knee in the gymnasium on a vaulting horse, Oswald Harland, the 10-year-old son of a master, died of pyaemia in Leeds General Infirmary.

By the 1950s the schools were known as West Leeds High School for Boys, with 500 boys, and West Leeds High School for Girls, with 450 girls. They were administered by the City of Leeds Education Committee. In 1959 the Girls School moved to a new campus and formed West Leeds Girls' High School on the Congress Mount Campus, with 550 girls. The Boys' school remained at the Tong Road Campus and formed West Leeds Boys' High School on Whingate, with 550 boys.

Comprehensive
The schools retained their name as 13–18 ages comprehensives. In 1993 the two schools merged to form West Leeds High School. The Congress Mount Campus was expanded in 1999 to become the size it is today. The boys' campus was sold off and converted to 66 apartments by North British Houseing and renamed as 'Old School Lofts'. The School also merged with Benjamin Gott High School, as that school had failing results and a falling pupil roll.

In 2004 the School successfully applied for Technology Status and became West Leeds High School Specialist Technology College. The School renovated some classrooms and fitted new SmartBoard software.

Performance
The school increased its A*-C GCSE examination results from 19% in 2000 to 39% in 2006.

Closure

In 2006 the school was informed that it would be merging with another local school, Wortley High School, to form a new school because of the falling birth rate in the local area. Both schools opposed the merger saying that this would create more disadvantages than benefits. The merger was approved and construction of the new school began in 2008 on the West Leeds High School site, named, in May 2008, Swallow Hill Community College. In September 2009, After the new school was completed, the West Leeds buildings were closed. In October 2009 the school buildings began to be demolished to be replaced with sports fields for the new school. However the original 1907 school still stands, a listed building on Whingate where it was converted into apartments.

Former teachers
John Wishart (statistician), known for the Wishart distribution, taught mathematics from 1922 to 1924.
Stanley Wilson, the leading British javelin thrower in the 1930s, taught PE at the school in the 1950s, 1960s and 1970s.

Alumni

Boys' grammar school
 Sir Jeffrey Benson, businessman, Group Chief Executive from 1978 to 1982 of NatWest, and President from 1983 to 1985 of the Institute of Bankers (now called the ifs School of Finance)
 Joseph Hiley, Conservative MP from 1959 to 1974 for Pudsey
 Bill Bowes, Yorkshire and England cricketer
 Alex Lyon, Labour MP
 Prof Colin McGreavy, Professor of Chemical Engineering from 1974 to 1997 at the University of Leeds
 John Sheldon OBE, Joint General Secretary from 1996 to 2000 of the Public and Commercial Services Union, and General Secretary from 1993 to 1996 of the National Union of Civil and Public Servants, and from 1982 to 1988 of the Civil Service Union
 Cecil Shipp CB OBE, deputy Director-General from 1982 to 1988 of MI5
 Phil Tate, musician
 Amman Ahmed – Entrepreneur – Visited the school on 11 October 2013 and was quoted as saying "Started from the bottom now we here"
Sir Harold Fieldhouse KBE  Permanent Secretary responsible in 1948 for shepherding the three major Acts through Parliament creating the Welfare State. Father of Admiral of the Fleet The Lord Fieldhouse of Gosport who in 1982 commanded the forces tasked with retaking the Falkland Islands.
 Professor Darren Griffin BSc, PhD, DSc, CBiol, FRSA, FRSB, FRCPath.  Professor of Genetics, University of Kent, 2007–present. https://www.kent.ac.uk/bio/profiles/staff/griffin.html
Peter Robinson, award-winning crime novelist, author of Inspector Banks novels.

Girls' grammar school
 Air Commodore Joan Metcalfe CB, Director of Royal Air Force Nursing Services (Princess Mary's Royal Air Force Nursing Service) from 1978 to 1981

References
 West Leeds High School Specialist Technology College at Leeds Learning Network. Retrieved 13 October 2009.
 Ofsted (Office for Standards in Education, Children's Services and Skills). Retrieved 13 October 2009.

External links

 New Name and Headteacher

Media
 Former science teacher jailed in 2008
 Parents sent to prison in 2004 for truanting children
 Girl murdered in November 2000

Educational institutions established in 1907
Educational institutions disestablished in 2009
Defunct grammar schools in England
Defunct schools in Leeds
1907 establishments in England
2009 disestablishments in England